Cowboy Songs may refer to:

Cowboy Songs and Other Frontier Ballads by John A. Lomax, 1920
 Cowboy Songs (Bing Crosby album), 1939
 Cowboy Songs (Michael Martin Murphey album), 1990
 Cowboy Songs (Riders in the Sky album), 1996

See also 
 Cowboy Song (disambiguation)